Omar Martinez (born November 3, 1998), more commonly known by his stage name Illuminize, is an American music producer of Peruvian descent. The first release from Illuminize was a single titled Reality, which was introduced under Scantraxx's X-Bone label. Reality was Martinezs debut on Spotify and secured him a spot on Hardstyle.coms Top 100 list. Following this was his Scantraxx Debut titled Radiate. Shortly after, Illuminize released his third track titled Leave a Light with Nino Lucarelli.

Career 
Martinez started producing at the age of 15, and started Illuminize in 2017. In 2018 Illuminize released his first track, Reality, on X-Bone, which is a sub label under the larger and more well known Scantraxx Recordz. This release piqued the interest of hard dance fans. In July 2019 Illuminize released a track featuring Nashville based vocalist Weldon titled Radiate, shortly after in December 2019, Martinez released his third single featuring widely known vocalist Nino Lucarelli titled Leave a Light.

Discography

Singles 
 "Reality" (2018)
 "Radiate" with Weldon (2019)
 "Leave a Light" with Nino Lucarelli (2019)

Mixes 
 "The Hard City Episode #18 Feat. Illuminize"

References

1998 births
Living people
American DJs
Record producers from Georgia (U.S. state)
Remixers